The Château de Pommiers is a château in Vérac, Gironde, Nouvelle-Aquitaine, France.

Châteaux in Gironde